Purian (also Purían) is a pair of extinct languages of eastern Brazil:

Purí 
Coroado Puri (also known as Colorado)

Coropó (Koropó), once spoken in Minas Gerais and Rio de Janeiro, was added by Campbell (1997), but removed again by Ramirez et al. (2015).

Purian is part of the Macro-Jê proposal. However, when Coropó is removed, there are not sufficient lexical connections to maintain this classification.

Attestation
The Purian languages are only attested by a few word lists from the 19th century. The lists are:

Puri:
Martius (1863: 194-195), collected in 1818 at São João do Presídio (now Visconde do Rio Branco, Minas Gerais).
Eschwege (2002: 122-127), collected in 1815 near São João do Presídio
Torrezão (1889: 511-513), collected in 1885 at Abre Campo (near Manhuaçu, Minas Gerais)

Coroado:
Martius (1863: 195-198), collected in 1818 near São João do Presídio
Eschwege (2002: 122-127), collected in 1815 near São João do Presídio
Marlière (Martius, 1889: 198-207), collected between 1817-1819 at missions along the lower Paraíba do Sul River
Saint-Hilaire (2000: 33), collected in 1816 near Valença, Rio de Janeiro

Koropó is attested by two word lists:
Eschwege (2002: 122-127), 127 words collected in 1815
Schott (1822, pp. 48-51), 55 words collected in 1818

Distribution
The Purian languages were spoken in a continuous region stretching from the Preto River to the Paraíba River (from Queluz, São Paulo to Paraibuna, São Paulo). The Puri occupied the Upper Paraíba do Sul River up to Queluz, São Paulo, and the Coroado from the Pomba River to the Doce River in Minas Gerais.

Dialects
Mason (1950) lists the following dialects of Coroado and Purí:

Coroado 
Maritong
Cobanipake
Tamprun
Sasaricon
Purí
Sabonan
Wambori
Shaynishuna

Other languages
Extinct and unknown languages that may have been Purian languages:

Caracatan - once spoken on the Caratinga River and Manhuaçu River, Minas Gerais.
Bucan - found between Funil and Itacolumi near Mariana, Minas Gerais.
Arasi - in Minas Gerais, Serra Ibitipoca and near Barbacena.
Bacunin - near the city of Valença and on the Preto River.
Airuan - Minas Gerais, between the Piranga River and Branco River.
Bocayú - on the Pomba River.
Aripiado - in the Serra da Araponga, Minas Gerais.
Aredé - between Itabirito and Espinhaço.
Guaraxué - between Ouro Preto, Mariana and Piranga.
Sacarú - state of Rio de Janeiro on the Paraíba River.
Paraíba - state of Rio de Janeiro on the Paraíba River.
Pitá - state of Rio de Janeiro, on the Bonito River.
Xumeto - in the Serra da Mantiqueira, state of Rio de Janeiro.
Guarú - south of the Pitá tribe, state of Rio de Janeiro.
Lôpo or Rôpo - in the Serra de Abre Campo, state of Minas Gerais.
Abatipó - once spoken on the Matipó River, Minas Gerais.
Caxine - in the state of Minas Gerais between the Preto River and Paraíba River, and near Valença, Rio de Janeiro.
Caramonan - state of Minas Gerais, between the Pomba River and Doce River.
Waitaka or Goytacaz - formerly spoken on the São Mateus River and in the vicinity of Cabo de São Tomé, state of Rio de Janeiro.

Vocabulary
Loukotka (1968) lists the following basic vocabulary items.

{| class="wikitable sortable"
! gloss !! Puri !! Coroado !! Koropó
|-
! one
| omi || shombiuan || ipáĩn
|-
! two
| kuriri || chiri || alinkrin
|-
! three
|  || pátapakon || patepakon
|-
! tongue
| an-gué || topé || pitao
|-
! foot
| cha-peré || txa-peré || cham-brim
|-
! fire
| pothe || poté || ké
|-
! tree
| mpó || ambó || mebm
|-
! jaguar
| paüan || pauan || 
|-
! house
| ngguára || guar || sheume
|-
! white
| begotara || katáma || guatháma
|}

Proto-language

Silva Neto (2007) reconstructs 47 Proto-Purian forms. Reconstituted forms by Silva Neto (2007) for Puri, Coroado, and Koropó synthesized from historical sources are also provided.

{| class="wikitable sortable"
! no. !! English gloss (translated) !! Portuguese gloss (original) !! Proto-Purian !! Puri !! Coroado !! Koropó
|-
| 1 || water || água || *yaman || yaman || yaman || 
|-
| 2 || you (sg.) || você || *gá ||  || gá || gá
|-
| 3 || tapir || anta || *painan || penán || painá || 
|-
| 4 || here || aqui || *kará ||  || kará || kra
|-
| 5 || tree || árvore || *mpó || mpo || ãmpo || 
|-
| 6 || drink || beber || *mpa || mpa || pa || 
|-
| 7 || mouth || boca || *čore || čore || čore || šore, čore
|-
| 8 || hair || cabelo || *ké || ke || gué || iče, ke
|-
| 9 || head || cabeça || *kwe || kwe || ke || 
|-
| 10 || eat || comer || *maše || paše || maše || makšina, maše
|-
| 11 || finger || dedo || *šapere || šabrera || šapere || 
|-
| 12 || day || dia || *opé || opé || ope || 
|-
| 13 || tooth || dente || *če || uče || če || 
|-
| 14 || star || estrela || *yuri || šuri || yuri || dzuri, yuri
|-
| 15 || arrow || flecha || *apon || apon || apon || 
|-
| 16 || fire || fogo || *poté || poté || poté || 
|-
| 17 || cat || gato || *šapé ||  || šapi || šapé
|-
| 18 || brother || irmão || *čatay || šatã || čatay || šatay, čatay
|-
| 19 || daughter || filha || *šampe || šampe-mpayma || šãpe || boema
|-
| 20 || leaf || folha || *čope || dzoplé || čope || čupe
|-
| 21 || man || homem || *kwayman || kuayma, hakorema || kwayman || kwayman
|-
| 22 || moon || lua || *petara || petara || petara || 
|-
| 23 || mother || mãe || *ayan || ayan || ayan || ayan
|-
| 24 || maize || milho || *makπ || makπ || makπ || 
|-
| 25 || hand || mão || *šapore || kore, šapeprera || šapore, kokor¤e || 
|-
| 26 || mountain || monte || *pré || pré || pre || pré
|-
| 27 || large mountain || monte grande || *pré-heroyma || pré deka || pré-heroyma || pré-heroyma
|-
| 28 || much, very || muito || *purika || prika || purika || 
|-
| 29 || woman || mulher || *poyman || mpayma || poyman || boeman
|-
| 30 || nose || nariz || *ni || ni || yẽ || 
|-
| 31 || boy || menino || *šapoma ||  || šapona || šapoma
|-
| 32 || night || noite || *miriponan || miriponan || maripoyan || merĩdan
|-
| 33 || eye || olho || *merĩ || miri || merĩ || šwarĩ
|-
| 34 || ear || orelha || *pepéna || bipina || pepéna || 
|-
| 35 || father || pai || *are || are || uaré || 
|-
| 36 || bird || pássaro || *šipu || šipu || šapu || 
|-
| 37 || foot || pé || *čapere || šaprera || čapere || čamprĩ
|-
| 38 || feather || pluma || *pé || šipupé || pe || 
|-
| 39 || pig || porco || *šorã || sotanšira || šorã || 
|-
| 40 || river || rio || *rorá || mñama róra || yamã rora || kwã
|-
| 41 || sun || sol || *opé || opé || ope || 
|-
| 42 || afternoon || tarde || *tušahi || tošora, tušahi || šare || 
|-
| 43 || earth || terra || *oše || guašé, ušó || oše || 
|-
| 44 || trunk || tronco || *pranü || pon-réna || põ pranü || 
|-
| 45 || wind || vento || *džota || džota || nan dota || narã dzota
|-
| 46 || belly || ventre, barriga || *tikĩ || tikĩ || tekĩ || ičĩ
|-
| 47 || herb, plant, grass || erva, planta, capim || *šapuko || šapúko, spangué || šapuko || šapuka
|}

However, similarities in Koropó were later found to be loanwords by Ramirez et al. (2015), who classifies Koropó as Maxakalían. Nikulin (2020) also classifies Koropó as Macro-Jê (Maxakalían branch).

References

Bibliography
Campbell, Lyle. (1997). American Indian languages: The historical linguistics of Native America. New York: Oxford University Press. .
Kaufman, Terrence. (1994). The native languages of South America. In C. Mosley & R. E. Asher (Eds.), Atlas of the world's languages (pp. 46–76). London: Routledge.

External links

 PROEL: Familia Purían

 
Language families
Extinct languages of South America
Indigenous languages of Eastern Brazil